SS Eastfield was a 2,150-ton armed steamship which was torpedoed by the German U-boat  on 27 November 1917. The cargo of coal can be found scattered on the sea bed nearby.

The ship was built by Osbourne, Graham & Company of Sunderland in 1901, and owned by The Field Line (Cardiff) Ltd.

References

1900 ships
Ships built on the River Wear
World War I shipwrecks in the English Channel
Wreck diving sites in the United Kingdom
Maritime incidents in 1917
Ships sunk by German submarines in World War I